Big Pool is an unincorporated community and census-designated place in western Washington County, Maryland, United States. Its population was 82 as of the 2010 census. It is between Clear Spring, Maryland and Hancock, Maryland along Interstate 70 and is officially a part of the Hagerstown Metropolitan Area.

To the south of Big Pool lies Fort Frederick State Park, a restored fort used during the French and Indian War. Also nearby is the Chesapeake and Ohio Canal National Historical Park, which lies near Ft. Frederick alongside the Potomac River.

Big Pool is also the name of a large body of water which is part of the Chesapeake and Ohio Canal. This pool occurs roughly at the 113 mile mark, and it is on what the canallers called the 14 mile level.

References

External links

Fort Frederick State Park
Official C & O Canal National Historical Park Service Site

Unincorporated communities in Washington County, Maryland
Unincorporated communities in Maryland
Census-designated places in Washington County, Maryland
Census-designated places in Maryland